William of Blois or William de Blois may refer to:
William, Count of Blois (c.772–834), count of Blois from 830 to 34
William, Count of Sully (c.1085–c.1150), count of Blois from 1102 to 1107, brother of King Stephen of England
William I, Count of Boulogne (c.1137–1159), count of Boulogne from 1153 to 1159, son of King Stephen of England
William of Blois (poet) (fl.1167), abbot of Maniaci, sometimes confused with the bishop of Lincoln
William de Blois (bishop of Lincoln), in office from 1203 to 1206, probably related to the bishop of Worcester
William de Blois (bishop of Worcester), in office from 1218 to 1236, probably related to the bishop of Lincoln